Elections were held in the Australian state of Victoria on Saturday 12 June 1937 to elect 17 of the 34 members of the state's Legislative Council for six year terms. MLC were elected using preferential voting.

For the first time, voting became compulsory for elections for the Legislative Council, having been compulsory for the elections for the Legislative Assembly since 1927. However, the turnout increased from 10% to only 46%.

Results

Legislative Council

|}

Retiring Members
Herbert Keck (UAP, Bendigo) died shortly before the election; no by-election was held.

Candidates
Sitting members are shown in bold text. Successful candidates are highlighted in the relevant colour. Where there is possible confusion, an asterisk (*) is also used.

See also
1937 Victorian state election

References

1937 elections in Australia
Elections in Victoria (Australia)
1930s in Victoria (Australia)
June 1937 events